Elsehul (also Paddocks Cove, Else Cove, Elsie Bay, Elsa Bay,  Else's Hole, and Else Bay) is a bay along the north coast of South Georgia Island in the southern Atlantic Ocean. The name "Elsehul" dates back to the period 1905–12 and was probably applied by Norwegian sealers and whalers working in the area. The Discovery Investigations (DI) expedition of 1930 surveyed Elsehul and the surrounding area, naming many features. A British Admiralty chart dating to 1931 provided the first instance of many other names; unless otherwise specified, features noted in this article were first named on this chart.

Named features

Western shore 
A shoal known as Fairway Patch lies in the entrance of the bay.

The Knob defines the east coast of a small cove, Joke Cove. South of The Knob is Inner Bay, which comprises the entire southern portion of Elsehul.

Eastern shore 
On the eastern shore, Pyramid Point defines the eastern boundary of Inner Bay. Continuing north, Pull Point sits half a nautical mile (.93 km) south of Cape Pride, which marks the east side of the entrance to Elsehul. Cape Pride appears to have been named by DI personnel. It was originally named "Pillar Rock," but renamed to avoid confusion with another feature of that name. The name Stina Rock was proposed by the United Kingdom Antarctic Place-Names Committee (UK-APC) in 1957.

The name appears on a chart based upon surveys by DI personnel between 1926 and 1930, and comes from Søren Berntsen and Herman Berntsen, managers of the Tønsberg Hvalfangeri whaling station at Husvik.

References 

Bays of South Georgia